Mark Burgess may refer to:

 Mark Burgess (cricketer) (born 1944), New Zealand cricketer
 Mark Burgess (children's author) (born 1957), English writer and illustrator of children's books
 Mark Burgess (musician) (born 1960), English musician
 Mark Burgess (playwright) (born 1960), writer of A Modern Love Story, actor and teacher at Bedford Modern School
 Mark Burgess (computer scientist) (born 1966), Norwegian computer scientist
 Mark Burgess (actor) in Prince Charming